Tjamuaha (also: Tjamuaha waTjirwe, literally , born ca. 1790 in Otjikune, died December 1861 in Okahandja) was a chief of the Herero people in South-West Africa, today's Namibia, and the father of Maharero. He was a close ally and subordinate of Jonker Afrikaner, Captain of the Oorlam Afrikaners, and stayed with him in Windhoek for most of his chieftaincy. With Tjamuaha's death, hostilities started between the Nama people and the Herero.

References

Notes

Literature
 

Herero people
1790s births
1861 deaths
Year of birth uncertain
People from Otjozondjupa Region